Raúl García (born 25 December 1943 in Mexico City) is a Mexican former wrestler who competed in the 1968 Summer Olympics and in the 1972 Summer Olympics.

References

External links
 

1943 births
Living people
Sportspeople from Mexico City
Olympic wrestlers of Mexico
Wrestlers at the 1968 Summer Olympics
Wrestlers at the 1972 Summer Olympics
Mexican male sport wrestlers
Pan American Games bronze medalists for Mexico
Pan American Games medalists in wrestling
Wrestlers at the 1971 Pan American Games
Medalists at the 1971 Pan American Games
20th-century Mexican people
21st-century Mexican people